Darius Williams (born August 11, 1998) is a professional gridiron football defensive back for the Ottawa Redblacks of the Canadian Football League (CFL). He played college football at Carson-Newman University.

Early life and high school 
Williams was born and raised in St. Petersburg, Florida. He attended school at Osceola Fundamental High School for his freshman and the first semester of his sophomore year. He then transferred to Northside Christian School. He played as a safety while at Northside Christian School. He was named a Blue-Gray all-American and Pinellas County All-Star for having the most tackles for a defensive back over a two-year period in high school.

College 
Williams attended Carson–Newman University where he played for the Eagles. He participated in the East-West Shrine Bowl in 2020, after four seasons at the collegiate level. He recorded 179 tackles, a sack, eight interceptions, and two fumble recoveries in 41 games. He graduated from Carson-Newman University with a bachelor's degree in Exercise Science and Recreational Management.

Professional career

Edmonton Elks 
Williams signed with the Edmonton Elks on January 11, 2021. He played in all 14 regular season games where he had 30 defensive tackles, six special teams tackles, and one forced fumble. However, he was released on February 14, 2022.

Montreal Alouettes 
On February 17, 2022, Williams signed a one-year contract with the Montreal Alouettes. He played in his first game as an Alouette on June 16, 2022, where he also recorded his first career interception in the game against the Toronto Argonauts. He played in ten regular season games where he recorded nine defensive tackles, five special teams tackles, and two interceptions before being released on September 20, 2022.

Ottawa Redblacks 
On October 6, 2022, it was announced that Williams had signed a practice roster agreement with the Ottawa Redblacks.

References

External links 
Ottawa Redblacks profile

1998 births
Living people
American football defensive backs
American players of Canadian football
Canadian football defensive backs
Carson–Newman Eagles football players
Edmonton Elks players
Montreal Alouettes players
Ottawa Redblacks players
Players of American football from Florida
Sportspeople from St. Petersburg, Florida